This is a list of Bangladeshi films that were released in 2002.

See also
2002 in Bangladesh

References

External links

Films
Bangladeshi
 2002